Gaius Julius Vindex (c. AD 2568) was a Roman governor in the province of Gallia Lugdunensis. He was of a noble Gallic family of Aquitania (given senatorial status under Claudius) and was one of the men belonging to a faction of Empress Agrippina, the mother of Nero. Vindex had taken part in a conspiracy against the emperor in 59. However, with the assassination of Agrippina by Nero, this faction was dissolved.

In either late 67 or early 68, Vindex rebelled against Emperor Nero. Though the aims of his followers may have been more complex, Vindex, as a senator, probably had the aim simply of replacing Nero with a better emperor. 

According to the historian Cassius Dio, Vindex "was powerful in body and of shrewd intelligence, was skilled in warfare and full of daring for any great enterprise; and he had a passionate love of freedom and a vast ambition". In order to gain support, he declared his allegiance to the then governor of Hispania Tarraconensis, Servius Sulpicius Galba. 

The commander of the Germania Superior army, Lucius Verginius Rufus advanced against him. The battle between their two forces took place near Vesontio (modern Besançon).  What occurred then is unclear, but, despite a meeting between Verginius and Vindex, the forces under Verginius seem to have decided on a battle without orders. Desire for plunder and the weakness of Verginius as a commander are possible explanations. Vindex was defeated in the resulting battle and subsequently committed suicide.

By June 68, military support for Galba eventually led to Nero's committing suicide. Galba, acclaimed by the Senate, struck coins to commemorate Vindex, to whom he owed his position as emperor.

Following normal Roman procedures, his name Gaius Julius indicated that his family had likely been given citizenship under Gaius Julius Caesar, or perhaps Emperor Augustus or Caligula.

References

External links
 Donahue, John, "Galba (68-69 A.D.)", De Imperatoribus Romanis
 Lendering, Jona, "Caius Julius Vindex", Livius

1st-century Gallo-Roman people
20s births
68 deaths
Ancient Romans killed in action
Ancient Roman military personnel who committed suicide
Celtic warriors
Celts
Gaulish rulers
Vindex, Gaius
People of the Year of the Four Emperors
Roman governors of Gaul
Roman rebels